Georg Ludwig Ritter von Trapp (4 April 1880 – 30 May 1947) was an officer in the Austro-Hungarian Navy who later became the patriarch of the Trapp Family Singers. Trapp was the most successful Austro-Hungarian submarine commander of World War I, sinking 11 Allied merchant ships totaling 47,653 GRT and two Allied warships displacing a total of 12,641 tons. His first wife Agathe Whitehead died of scarlet fever in 1922, leaving behind seven children. Trapp hired Maria Augusta Kutschera to tutor one of his daughters and married Maria in 1927. When he lost most of his wealth in the Great Depression, the family turned to singing as a way of earning a livelihood. Trapp declined a commission in the German Navy after the Anschluss and settled in the United States.

Trapp's accomplishments during World War I earned him numerous decorations, including the Military Order of Maria Theresa. After his death in 1947, the family home in Stowe, Vermont, became a ski lodge, the Trapp Family Lodge. Maria von Trapp's 1949 memoir The Story of the Trapp Family Singers was adapted into the West German film The Trapp Family (1956), which served as the basis for the Rodgers and Hammerstein musical The Sound of Music (1959) and the film adaptation directed by Robert Wise (1965).

Early life
Georg Ludwig Ritter von Trapp was born in Zara, Dalmatia, then a Crown Land of the Austro-Hungarian Empire (present-day Zadar, Croatia). His father, Fregattenkapitän August Johann Trapp, was a naval officer who had been elevated to the Austrian nobility as Ritter von Trapp when he was awarded the Order of the Iron Crown Third Class. Both his sons inherited this hereditary title of Ritter (Knight). August Ritter von Trapp died in 1884, when Georg was four.

Trapp's mother was Hedwig Wepler. His older sister was the Austrian artist Hede von Trapp, and his brother Werner died in 1915 during World War I.

Naval career
In 1894, aged fourteen, Trapp followed in his father's footsteps and joined the Imperial and Royal Austro-Hungarian Navy, entering the naval academy at Fiume (now Rijeka). As part of their required education, all naval cadets were taught to play a musical instrument; Georg von Trapp selected the violin. He graduated four years later and completed two years of follow-on training voyages, including one to Australia, as a cadet aboard the sail training corvette SMS Saida II. On the voyage home he visited the Holy Land where he met a Franciscan friar who took him on a tour of all the Biblical sites he wanted to see. Among other things, Trapp bought seven bottles of water from the Jordan River which were later used to baptize his first seven children.

In 1900, he was assigned to the protected cruiser  and was decorated for his performance during the Boxer Rebellion, in which he participated in the assault on the Taku Forts. In 1902, he passed the final officer's examination, and was commissioned a Fregattenleutnant (frigate lieutenant, equivalent to sub-lieutenant) in May 1903. He was fascinated by submarines, and in 1908 seized the opportunity to transfer to the navy's newly formed submarine arm, or U-boot-Waffe, receiving promotion to Linienschiffsleutnant (ship-of-the-line lieutenant, or lieutenant) that November. In 1910 he was given command of the newly constructed . He commanded U-6 until 1913.

World War I

He conducted nine combat patrols in U-5, and sank two enemy warships. In hunting and sinking  Gambetta, Trapp achieved a notable success as commander of the first-ever underwater nighttime (and only the second) submarine attack on a vessel in the Adriatic. He also captured the Greek steamer Cefalonia off Durazzo on 29 August 1915. Some sources incorrectly credit Trapp with sinking the Italian troop transport , which resulted in the greatest loss of life in any submarine attack in World War I, but the ship was actually sunk by U-5 under another commander, Friedrich Schlosser (1885–1959).

He conducted ten more war patrols in the much larger submarine, attacking merchant ships instead of warships. Between April 1917 and October 1917, U-14 sank 11 Allied merchant ships under Trapp's command.

In May 1918, he was promoted to Korvettenkapitän (equal to Lieutenant commander) and given command of the submarine base at Cattaro in the Gulf of Kotor. However, Austria-Hungary's defeat in World War I also led to the Empire's collapse. The territory of the Austro-Hungarian Empire was divided among seven countries, with the Kingdom of Serbs, Croats and Slovenes keeping most of the seacoast. The Republic of German-Austria was landlocked and no longer had a navy, putting an end to Trapp's naval career.

War record

Trapp's patrols in U-5 and U-14 made him the most successful Austro-Hungarian submarine commander of World War I, sinking 11 Allied merchant ships totaling 47,653 GRT and 2 Allied warships displacing a total of 12,641 tons.

Orders, decorations and medals
 Knight's Cross of the Military Order of Maria Theresa (1924)
 Knight's Cross of the Imperial Order of Leopold
 Knight 2nd Class of the Order of the Iron Crown (1917)
 Bronze Military Merit Medal ("Signum Laudis")
 Military Merit Cross
 1898 Jubilee Medal
 1908 Jubilee Cross
 War Medal 1914–1918 with swords
 Long Service Cross (18 years)
 Iron Cross 1st and 2rd Class (German Empire)

First marriage and inherited wealth

Trapp married Agathe Gobertina Whitehead, the first daughter and third child of Countess Agathe Gobertina von Breunner-Enckevoirth (1856–1945), Austro-Hungarian nobility, and Cavaliere (Knight) John Whitehead (1854–1902), son of Robert Whitehead (1823–1905) who invented the modern torpedo and a partner at the family's Fiume Whitehead Torpedo Factory (not, as frequently stated, a niece of the British Government minister St. John Brodrick). The British government rejected Whitehead's invention, but Austrian Emperor Franz Josef invited him to open a torpedo factory in Fiume. Trapp's first command was the U-boat U-6 which was launched by Agathe.

Agathe's inherited wealth sustained the couple and permitted them to start a family, and they had two sons and five daughters over the next ten years. Their first child was Rupert, born on 1 November 1911 at Pula while the couple were living at Pina Budicina 11. Their other children were: Agathe, also born in Pula; Maria Franziska, Werner; Hedwig, and Johanna, all born at the family home the Erlhof in Zell am See; and Martina, born at the Martinsschlössel at Klosterneuburg, for which she was named.

On 3 September 1922, Agathe von Trapp died of scarlet fever contracted from her daughter Agathe. Trapp then acquired Villa Trapp in Aigen, a suburb of Salzburg, and moved his family there in 1924. During this period, he delivered several lectures and conducted interviews on his naval career.

Second marriage
About 1926, Maria Franziska was recovering from an illness and was unable to go to school, so Trapp hired Maria Augusta Kutschera, a novice from the nearby Nonnberg Abbey as a tutor. They were married on 26 November 1927 when he was 47 and she was 22. They had three children: Rosmarie, born on 8 February 1929, Eleonore (called Lorli), born 14 May 1931, and Johannes, born 17 January 1939 in Pennsylvania.

Turning to music

In 1935, Trapp's money, inherited from his English first wife, was invested in a bank in England. Austria was under economic pressure from a hostile Germany, and Austrian banks were in a precarious position. Trapp sought to help a friend in the banking business, Auguste Caroline Lammer (1885–1937), so he withdrew most of his money from London and deposited it in an Austrian bank. The bank failed, wiping out most of the family's substantial fortune.

At about that time, a Catholic priest, Franz Wasner, instructed the children in music. Around 1936, Lotte Lehmann heard the family sing, and she suggested they perform paid concerts. When the Austrian Chancellor Kurt von Schuschnigg heard them on the radio, he invited them to perform in Vienna.  Father Wasner became the group's musical director.

Departure from Austria
According to Maria von Trapp's memoirs, Georg von Trapp found himself in a vexing situation after the German takeover of Austria in 1938. He was offered a commission in the German Navy, a tempting proposition, but decided to decline the offer, being opposed to Nazi ideology. He also refused a request for the family to perform at an event for Hitler's birthday. The family decided to leave Austria.

On leaving Austria, the Trapps traveled by train to Italy (not over the mountains by foot to Switzerland as is depicted in The Sound of Music). The family had a contract with an American booking agent when they left Austria. Once in Italy, they contacted the agent and requested fare to America, first traveling to London, before sailing to the United States for their first concert tour.

In 1939 the family returned to Europe to tour Scandinavia, hoping to continue their concerts in cities beyond the reach of the Third Reich. During this time, they went back to Salzburg for a few months before returning to Sweden to finish the tour. From there, they traveled to Norway to begin the trip back to the United States in September 1939, just after World War II broke out.

After living for a short time in Merion, Pennsylvania, where their youngest child, Johannes, was born, the family settled in Stowe, Vermont, in 1941. They purchased a  farm in 1942 and converted it into the Trapp Family Lodge. In January 1947, Major General Harry J. Collins turned to the Trapp family in the US pleading for help for the Austrian people, having seen first-hand the suffering of the residents of Salzburg when he had arrived there with the 42nd Infantry Division after World War II. The Trapp Family founded the Trapp Family Austrian Relief, Inc.; the priest Franz Wasner, their pre-war friend, became its treasurer.

Death
Trapp died of lung cancer on 30 May 1947 in Stowe, Vermont. In The Story of the Trapp Family Singers (1949), Maria von Trapp pointed out that there was a high incidence of lung cancer among World War I U-Boat crews, due to the diesel and gasoline fumes and poor ventilation, and that his death could be considered service-related. She also acknowledged in her book that, like most men of the period, he was a heavy smoker.

Children

Portrayals
Trapp has been portrayed in various adaptations of his family's life such as The Sound of Music, both the 1965 film and the Broadway musical, as well as two German films, The Trapp Family (1956) and The Trapp Family in America (1958). However, these adaptations often altered the portrayal of the Captain. In real life and in the memoir The Story of the Trapp Family Singers, written by his second wife Maria Augusta Trapp, the Captain has been described as being a warm and loving father who was always around. However, the Captain was portrayed in a more negative light in many adaptations. For instance, in the 1965 film, Georg von Trapp was portrayed as a disciplinary man who always went away and did not care for his children or their feelings at the beginning of the film. BBC Radio presented a different account of the family in October, 2009, in a play by Annie Caulfield called The Von Trapps and Me, focused on Princess Yvonne, "the woman Captain Von Trapp jilted in order to marry Maria."

Notes

References

Map locations

1880 births
1947 deaths
Austrian emigrants to the United States
Austrian knights
Austrian nobility
Austrian male musicians
Austrian Roman Catholics
Austrian anti-fascists
Austro-Hungarian military personnel of World War I
Austro-Hungarian Navy officers
Deaths from cancer in Vermont
Deaths from lung cancer
Musical theatre characters
Emigrants from Austria after the Anschluss
People from Zadar
Georg
Knights Cross of the Military Order of Maria Theresa
Recipients of the Iron Cross (1914), 1st class
20th-century male musicians